Duet is an album by trumpeter Lester Bowie  and bassist Nobuyoshi Ino recorded in Japan in 1985 and released on the Paddle Wheel label. It features seven duet performances by Bowie and Ino.

Reception
The Allmusic review awarded the album 2 stars.

Track listing
 "Kami-Fusen" (Ino) - 8:54  
 "Moon Over Bourbon Street" (Sting) - 5:45  
 "Fela - Ellen David" (Bowie, Haden, Ino) - 5:46  
 "Baku-No-Akubi" (Ino)  4:37  
 "Wishful Thinking" (Bowie) - 8:01  
 "Three-Legged Race" (Ino) - 3:15  
 "Goin' Home"  (Dvořák, arranged Ino) - 4:22  
Recorded August 1 & 2, 1985 at The Sound Inn, Studio A, Tokyo, Japan.

Personnel
Lester Bowie – trumpet 
Nobuyoshi Ino – bass, synthesizer
Kimion Oikawa – Engineer
Masahiko Yuh – Producer

References

1985 albums
Lester Bowie albums